The 191nd Ohio Infantry Regiment, sometimes 191st Ohio Volunteer Infantry (or 191st OVI) was an infantry regiment in the Union Army during the American Civil War.

Service
The 191st Ohio Infantry was organized at Camp Chase in Columbus, Ohio January through February 1865 and mustered in for one year service under the command of Colonel Robert Lewis Kimberly.

The regiment left Ohio for Harpers Ferry, West Virginia, March 10, 1865. It was attached to 2nd Brigade, 1st Provisional Division, Army of the Shenandoah, March 20. Marched to Charleston March 21. Transferred to 2nd (Ohio) Brigade, 2nd Provisional Division, March 27. Duty near Charleston until April 4. Operations in the Shenandoah Valley in vicinity of Winchester, Stevenson's Depot, and Jordan's Springs, April to August.

The 191st Ohio Infantry mustered out of service August 27, 1865, at Winchester, Virginia, and was discharged September 5, 1865.

Casualties
The regiment lost a total of 29 enlisted men during service, all due to disease.

Commanders
 Colonel Robert Lewis Kimberly

See also

 List of Ohio Civil War units
 Ohio in the Civil War

References
 Dyer, Frederick H. A Compendium of the War of the Rebellion (Des Moines, IA:  Dyer Pub. Co.), 1908.
 Ohio Roster Commission. Official Roster of the Soldiers of the State of Ohio in the War on the Rebellion, 1861–1865, Compiled Under the Direction of the Roster Commission (Akron, OH: Werner Co.), 1886–1895.
 Reid, Whitelaw. Ohio in the War: Her Statesmen, Her Generals, and Soldiers (Cincinnati, OH: Moore, Wilstach, & Baldwin), 1868. 
Attribution

External links
 Ohio in the Civil War: 191st Ohio Volunteer Infantry by Larry Stevens
 National flag of the 191st Ohio Infantry
 Regimental flag of the 191st Ohio Infantry

Military units and formations established in 1865
Military units and formations disestablished in 1865
Units and formations of the Union Army from Ohio
1865 establishments in Ohio